Āb Band (also called Awbanḏ and Ow Band) is a village in Ghazni Province, in eastern Afghanistan. It is the district center of Ab Band District.

See also
 Ghazni Province

References 

Populated places in Ghazni Province